"Dear Me" (Korean: 내게 들려주고 싶은 말; RR: naege deullyeojugo sip-eun mal, literally "What You Want To Tell Me") is a song recorded by South Korean singer Taeyeon for the re-release of her second studio album Purpose (2019). It was released on January 15, 2020, as the lead single for the repackage version of the album by SM Entertainment. The song's lyrics were penned by Hwang Yu-ra (Jam Factory) and Yoo Ji-won (Lara Las Studios), while its music was composed by William Wenaus and Yoo Young-jin. Musically, "Dear Me" is a ballad featuring guitar, strings and Taeyeon's sentimental vocals.

Background 
On January 7, 2020, Taeyeon's agency SM Entertainment announced that her second full-length studio album would be re-released on January 15, 2020, while the third single was announced to be "Dear Me", which was released simultaneously with the release of the album. The song was described as a ballad song with the harmony of an acoustic guitar and string melody, combined with Taeyeon's emotional voice. Its lyrics that give warm comfort with a positive message to believe & love yourself more.

Chart performance
"Dear Me" debuted at number twenty on South Korea's Gaon Digital Chart for the chart issue dated January 12–18, 2020, becoming the singer's 36th top 20 single on the chart. The song also reached the sixteen position on the Billboard K-Pop Hot 100.

Personnel 
Credits are adapted from the CD booklet of Purpose (Repackage).
 Original title: Release Me
 Korean lyrics by Hwang Yoo-ra (Jam Factory), Yoo Ji-won (lalala Studio)
 Composed by William Wenaus, Yoo Young-jin
 Arranged by William Wenaus, Yoo Young-jin
 Vocal directed by Lee Joo-hyung
 Background vocals by Taeyeon, Park Joo-yeon
 Recorded by Lee Min-gyu at SM Yellow Tail Studio/ Kang Sunyoung at MonoTree Studio
 Pro Tools operating by Lee Joo-hyung
 Digital Editing by Lee Min-gyu at SM Yellow Tail Studio/ Kang Sunyoung at MonoTree Studio
 Engineered for Mix by Yoo Young-jin at SM BOOMINGSYSTEM
 Mixed by Yoo Young-jin at SM BOOMINGSYSTEM
 Mastered by Jeon Hoon at Sonic Korea

Charts

Weekly charts

Monthly charts

Awards and nominations

References 

2020 songs
2020 singles
SM Entertainment singles
Korean-language songs
Taeyeon songs
Songs written by Yoo Young-jin